Sudhir R. “Sid” Ahuja is the senior vice president of product development at Caregility, a New Jersey-based Telehealth company, and a Entrepreneur-in-Residence at Stevens Institute of Technology. He is a Bell Labs Fellow holding 23 patents and a member of IEEE.

Career
Ahuja earned his bachelor's degree in technology, with an emphasis on electrical engineering, from the Indian Institute of Technology (IIT), Bombay, in 1972. He subsequently attended Rice University in Houston, Texas, where in 1977 he obtained his Ph.D. in electrical engineering and computer science. Ahuja’s research has focused on multimedia communications, including voice recognition, VoIP, IP multimedia subsystems), text-to-speech, human-computer interaction, on-demand media, and speaker verification. After graduating, Ahuja found employment with Alcatel-Lucent, and worked with the global telecommunications equipment company for 17 years, holding positions such as vice president of joint partnerships and joint ventures. Additionally, he was the former senior vice president of product management at Yorktel.

References

External links
 Sudhir Ahuja on WorldCat
 Sudhir Ahuja on IPEXL

Living people
IIT Bombay alumni
Rice University alumni
American electrical engineers
Year of birth missing (living people)